The University of Lomé (abbreviated UL) is the largest university in Togo. Located in the city of Lomé, it was founded in 1970 as University of Benin and changed its name to the University of Lomé in 2001.

2011 student riots
In May 2011, the government of Togo ordered the indefinite closure of University of Lomé after students started riots demanding better conditions and food. The riots began on Wednesday, May 25, 2011, and escalated through the rest of the week culminating in a clash on Friday between students and police which required the use of tear gas to disperse the roughly 500 rioting students. Authorities stated that the rioters were invading lecture halls, assaulting lecturers and other students, and destroying university property. The university was closed on Friday, May 27, 2011.

The head of the institution, Koffi Ahadzi Nonon, stated that the students were upset that the university had introduced a new academic system  for which the students were unprepared. On May 26, 2011, the Embassy of the United States in Lomé, Togo, issued a warden message to U.S. citizens in Togo to avoid the university campus area until the riots had ceased and stating that tear gas may have been used on May 25, against the demonstrators.

On June 6, an agreement between the university and the students was reached as students affirmed their commitment to the new LMD academic system and that the university would improve the students' living conditions. On June 15, the head of student organization, the Movement for the Development of Togolese Students or MEET, was arrested for attempting to incite possible violent resistance. The head of Hacam — another student organization — condemned the actions of the head of MEET.

On July 8, students and government representatives signed a formal agreement allowing current students to continue on the classic academic system or switch to the LMD system at their option and which stated that the government would invest 2.4 billion CFA francs (roughly US$4,800,000) into the construction of new lectures halls and versatile teaching blocks at the University of Lomé and the University of Kara.

Alumni

 Gilbert Houngbo served as Prime Minister of Togo from 2008 until his resignation in 2012 and earned his Master of Business Administration at the University of Lomé. 
 Yawo Adomayakpor, Togo's ambassador to the Democratic Republic of the Congo, graduated from the University of Lomé.
 Augustin Koffi Winigah attended the University of Lomé, and earned his master's degree in law & development studies.
 Adolé Isabelle Glitho-Akueson, Professor of Animal Biology.
Kétévi Adiklè Assamagan, African American engineer and physicist at Brookhaven National Laboratory

References

External links 
 University of Lomé 

Educational institutions established in 1970
Universities and colleges in Togo
Buildings and structures in Lomé